
Gmina Jeleniewo, is a rural gmina (administrative district) in Suwałki County, Podlaskie Voivodeship, in north-eastern Poland.

The gmina contains part of the protected area called Suwałki Landscape Park.

Villages
Gmina Jeleniewo contains the villages and settlements of Bachanowo, Białorogi, Błaskowizna, Czajewszczyzna, Czerwone Bagno, Gulbieniszki, Hultajewo, Ignatówka, Jeleniewo, Kazimierówka, Krzemianka, Leszczewo, Łopuchowo, Malesowizna, Okrągłe, Podwysokie Jeleniewskie, Prudziszki, Rutka, Rychtyn, Ścibowo, Sidorówka, Sidory, Sidory Zapolne, Suchodoły, Sumowo, Szeszupka, Szurpiły, Udryn, Udziejek, Wodziłki, Wołownia, Zarzecze Jeleniewskie and Żywa Woda.

Neighbouring gminas
Gmina Jeleniewo is bordered by the city of Suwałki and by the gminas of Przerośl, Rutka-Tartak, Suwałki, Szypliszki and Wiżajny.

References
Polish official population figures 2006

Jeleniewo
Suwałki County